Christine Hellen Amongin Aporu is a Ugandan educator and politician. She served as the State Minister for Teso Affairs in the Office of the Prime Minister in the Cabinet of Uganda. She was appointed to that position on 27 May 2011. She represented Kumi District in Parliament as a women's representative.

Background and education
She was born in Kumi District on 22 May 1958. She attended Nabuyanga Primary School and Soroti Secondary School. She studied at St. Aloysius Teachers College, in Ngora District, graduating with the Grade III Certificate in Teaching, in 1979. In 1986, she graduated from the Institute of Teacher Education Kyambogo, now part of Kyambogo University, with the Diploma in Education. She holds the degree of Bachelor of Education, obtained from Makerere University in 1996. She also holds a postgraduate Diploma in Management from Uganda Management Institute (UMI), awarded in 2005. Her degree of Masters in Human Resources Management was obtained from UMI in 2009.

Career
Amongin Aporu began her career as a primary school teacher in 1980, serving in that capacity until 1984. Following her graduation from ITEK in 1986, she became a tutor at a teacher training college, serving in that capacity until 1996. She was first elected to represent Kumi District in 1996. Between 2001 and 2006, she served as a State Minister. She was a member of the Demobilization Resettlement Team of the Amnesty Commission, following the departure of the LRA from Ugandan soil. Following the 2011 national election she was appointed Minister of State for Teso Affairs.

See also
Cabinet of Uganda
Parliament of Uganda

References

External links
Website of the Office of The Prime Minister of Uganda - Teso Affairs Section

Living people
Government ministers of Uganda
Members of the Parliament of Uganda
Itesot people
National Resistance Movement politicians
Makerere University alumni
Kyambogo University alumni
Uganda Management Institute alumni
People from Kumi District
People from Eastern Region, Uganda
1958 births
21st-century Ugandan women politicians
21st-century Ugandan politicians
Women government ministers of Uganda
Women members of the Parliament of Uganda